The Glynn County mass murder was discovered on August 29, 2009, when eight dead bodies were found at the New Hope Mobile Home Park in Glynn County, Georgia, near Brunswick. There were also two people found injured, one of whom later died of injuries.

Murders
At approximately 8:15 am on August 29, 2009, police received a 9-1-1 call from a 22-year-old man, Guy Heinze Jr., claiming that his whole family had been beaten to death. On arrival at the trailer park, they found seven people dead and two others critically injured. One of those injured, 19-year-old Michael Toler, died the following day in the hospital. On September 8, police stated that the victims had been beaten with a large instrument. They believed that three people committed the crime.

The murders gained international attention and have been referred to as the worst mass murder case in Georgia state history.

Arrest of Heinze
Police arrested Heinze on suspicion of tampering with evidence at the crime scene and on drug possession charges. Glynn County Police gave a press conference on August 30 in which they would not identify the other victims, but stated their ages ranged from "older than infants to their mid-40s". Police chief Matt Doering said, "I wouldn't call Mr. Heinze a suspect, but I won't rule him out either."

Trial
On September 14, 2009, Heinze was indicted by a grand jury, and prosecutors intended to seek the death penalty. In 2011, defense attorneys were given permission to observe DNA testing of a broken gun stock and other items recovered from the scene of the crimes. The judge originally assigned to the trial resigned in 2011 for reasons unrelated to the case. Heinze pleaded not guilty at an arraignment hearing on February 23, 2012.  During the trial, the prosecution put forward the theory that drugs and money was the prime motivation for the murders. Heinze's defense countered that the investigation refused to consider other suspects in the killings. On October 25, 2013, Heinze was convicted of all eight murders and sentenced to life imprisonment with no chance of parole. Prosecutors decided not to seek the death penalty as part of the deal with the defense when juror 152 was removed and replaced by a substitute.

On December 7, 2020, Heinze's conviction was upheld by the Supreme Court of Georgia.

Media documentary
On March 24, 2014, parts of the trial were included in a televised UK BBC 3 documentary about the case; Judgement (Life and Death Row, series 1 episode 2).

References

2009 murders in the United States
2009 in Georgia (U.S. state)
Attacks in the United States in 2009
Brunswick, Georgia
Glynn County, Georgia
Mass murder in 2009
August 2009 crimes in the United States
August 2009 events in the United States
Mass murder in the United States
Murder in Georgia (U.S. state)
Family murders